Captain Guy Fraser Disney  (born 17 March 1982) is a British steeplechase jockey. He is the first amputee jockey to win a horse race at a professional race-course in Britain. He won the Royal Artillery Gold Cup, on his horse, Rathlin Rose, at Sandown Park Racecourse, in Esher in Surrey, on 17 February 2017. Disney's horse was trained by racehorse trainer David Pipe.

As a former serviceman in the British Army, Disney said his thoughts turned to his fallen colleagues in Afghanistan when he won.

Education
From the years 1995–2000, Disney was educated at Malvern College, a co-educational boarding and day independent school in the town of Malvern in Worcestershire, in the West of England, followed by the Royal Agricultural University in the market town of Cirencester in Gloucestershire, also in the West of England.

Life and career
Guy Disney served in The Light Dragoons, a cavalry regiment of the British Army, in Afghanistan. He suffered a life-changing injury, leading to leg amputation, and the fitting of a prosthetic leg, when his vehicle was hit by a rocket-propelled grenade while on patrol in Babaji in Helmand Province, in July 2009.

Disney has since worked for the charitable organisation Walking With The Wounded, which helps wounded former British Armed Forces servicemen and women to transition to civilian life. In March 2014, he returned to his former boarding school, Malvern College, to talk about his successful expedition with the organisation, accompanied by other wounded former service personnel, to both the North and South Poles. 
Disney was initially rejected in his application to ride with a prosthetic limb by the British Horseracing Authority, but was eventually granted a licence in 2015, finishing third place on the horse Ballyallia Man at Sandown Park's Royal Artillery Gold Cup on 13 February in the same year.

He was appointed Member of the Order of the British Empire (MBE) in the 2020 New Year Honours for services to horse racing, polar expeditions and veterans' charities.

References

1982 births
Living people
Alumni of the Royal Agricultural University
British amputees
British Army personnel of the War in Afghanistan (2001–2021)
British jockeys
English jockeys
People educated at Malvern College
People in horse racing
Members of the Order of the British Empire
Light Dragoons officers